Schlarman Academy is a private, Roman Catholic academy composed of two campuses. Previously, the Vermilion County Catholic grade schools included: Holy Family, St. Mary’s, and St. Paul’s. In July 2011, these schools consolidated with Schlarman High School to form what is now known as Schlarman Academy. The "South Campus" is a combined primary and middle school (kindergarten through 6th grade) located in the building formerly known as St. Paul School, located at the corner of Walnut St. and Vermilion St. The "North Campus" is a secondary school (7th grade through 12th grade) campus located in the building formerly known as Schlarman High School at the corner of Winter St. and Vermilion St. in Danville, Vermilion County, Illinois.  The school was established in 1945 and named after Joseph Schlarman, bishop of the archdiocese at that time.

Schlarman's mascot is The Hilltopper, because the secondary school campus sits on top of a hill close to Lake Vermilion. It is a relatively small school in terms of enrollment, but the north campus is quite expansive and has a large gymnasium. Its north campus comprises one of three high schools in Danville, the others being the city's sole public high school, Danville High School, several blocks away and First Baptist Christian School located across Vermilion Street from the south campus. Schlarman Academy is a school of the Roman Catholic Diocese of Peoria.

Athletics
Schlarman competes in the IESA and IHSA, and is part of the Vermilion Valley Conference in sports such as baseball, basketball, football, softball and volleyball.

Notable alumni
 Zeke Bratkowski (American football), former NFL player

Notes and references

External links
 Schlarman Academy official site

Buildings and structures in Danville, Illinois
Catholic secondary schools in Illinois
Roman Catholic Diocese of Peoria
Educational institutions established in 1945
1945 establishments in Illinois
Schools in Vermilion County, Illinois